Zaran in Iran may refer to:
 Zaran, West Azerbaijan
 Zaran, Zanjan